Preethsod Thappa is a 1998 Indian Kannada-language romance drama film directed by Ravichandran and produced by Rockline Venkatesh. The film stars Ravichandran and Shilpa Shetty. Actors Lokesh and Lakshmi and Prakash Raj feature in other prominent roles. The film is a remake of the Telugu film Ninne Pelladata (1996).

Plot 
Raja is seen racing in a bike race, faces all the obstacles, defeats everybody and is victorious in the race. He lives with his parents Sathya and Mahalakshmi and many others which includes his uncle, maternal uncle, family friend and their families. They all love each other and live like one big family. Chandana lives in Mangalore with her parents and two younger sisters. She wants to pursue pilot training in Bangalore, thus shifts to Raja's house and stays as a guest. Chandana and Raja's family bond well together. Raja and Chandana gradually fall in love. 

After discovering that Chandana stays in Sathya's house,  her father takes her with him. In the flashback it is revealed that Chandana's mother Bhavani is Sathya's sister who married Chandana's father against Sathya's wish. Enraged Sathya had tried to kill Chandana's father.  Back in the present we see men of  both the families holding grudge against each other.  Chandana's father fixes her marriage with another man.  Chandana who feels that Raja could not prevent the marriage consumes poison.  But Raja comes to her house, beats all the goons hired by her father and escapes from there with her.  Chandana due to the poison, vomits blood.  She is hospitalized.  Both the families wait outside the operation theatre . They ultimately realize their mistake, forgive each other and happily agree for Raja and Chandana's marriage.  In the end, Chandana comes out of the operation theatre healed and hugs Raja.

Cast 
 V. Ravichandran as Raja
 Shilpa Shetty as Chandana
 Prakash Raj as Chandana's father
 Lokesh as Sathya
 Lakshmi as Mahalakshmi
 Srinivasa Murthy as Murthy
 Doddanna as Puttaswamy
 Vinaya Prasad as Bhavani
 Ramakrishna as Hari
 Umashree as Uma
 Ramesh Bhat as Vasu
 Y. Vijaya as Vijaya
 Suchitra
 Tennis Krishna as Tennis
 Mandeep Roy
 Adarsha
 Shivadwaj as Shivu
 Rockline Venkatesh

Soundtrack 
All the songs are composed and written by Hamsalekha. This was the last film with Hamsalekha - Ravichandran combination before they parted ways due to the differences in opinion.

References

External links 
 

1998 films
1990s Kannada-language films
Indian romantic drama films
Kannada remakes of Telugu films
Films scored by Hamsalekha
Films directed by V. Ravichandran
1998 romantic drama films